Norman Cross (August 16, 1910 – April 25, 1982) was an American Negro league pitcher in the 1930s.

A native of New Orleans, Louisiana, Cross pitched in several seasons for the Chicago American Giants between 1932 and 1937. He died in Chicago, Illinois in 1982 at age 71.

References

External links
 and Baseball-Reference Black Baseball stats and Seamheads

1910 births
1982 deaths
Chicago American Giants players
Baseball pitchers
Baseball players from New Orleans
20th-century African-American sportspeople